Atrophia Maculosa Varioliformis Cutis (AMVC) is a condition involving spontaneous scarring, specifically depressed scars on the face which occurs over a period of months to years. It appears to only affect children and young adults, is considered to be quite rare, normally occurs on the cheeks, temple area and forehead, and is neither well understood nor presently treatable. Case reports indicate the scars deepen over time but remain relatively superficial, with the frequency of new scar appearance diminishing over time.

AMVC is quite difficult to diagnose by dermatologists, for reasons including the depressed box and ice pick scars being very similar to those caused by Acne vulgaris. A confident diagnosis can be made if such scars recently appeared without present acne and without a history of acne.  Otherwise, the correct diagnosis is usually not made, and even doing so provides little benefit; there is no treatment.  It has been suggested in case reports that the condition, although rare, is likely underreported.

References 

Cutaneous conditions